At the ceremonial opening of the Tenth Republican Parliament on June 18, 2010, the Prime Minister Kamla Persad-Bissessar announced that the date for the 2010 Local Elections was to be on July 26, 2010.

Regional Corporations

134 Local Areas were contested in 14 Corporations.

 Diego Martin Regional Corporation
 Port of Spain City Corporation
 San Juan–Laventille Regional Corporation
 Tunapuna–Piarco Regional Corporation
 Arima Borough Corporation
 Sangre Grande Regional Corporation
 Chaguanas Borough Corporation
 Couva–Tabaquite–Talparo Regional Corporation
 San Fernando City Corporation
 Princes Town Regional Corporation
 Penal–Debe Regional Corporation
 Siparia Regional Corporation
 Point Fortin Borough Corporation
 Rio Claro–Mayaro Regional Corporation

Results

City of Port of Spain: (PNM)

 St James West—Robin Bynoe (UNC)
 St James East—Balliram Ramsuchit (COP)
 Woodbrook—Cleveland Phillip Garcia (COP)
 Northern Port of Spain—Keron Valentine (PNM)
 Belmont East—Darryl Rajpaul (PNM)
 Belmont North and West—Deanne Boucaud (PNM)
 Southern Port of Spain—Ryan Junior Dunbar (PNM)
 East Dry River—Isha Wells (PNM)
 St Ann's River South—Ashtine Thomason (PNM)
 St Ann's River Central—Natasha Young (PNM)
 St Ann's River North—Nedra Marisa McClean (PNM)
 Belmont South—Jennel Young (PNM)

City of San Fernando: (Partnership)

 Marabella West—Gloria Calliste (COP)
 Marabella East—Jason Williams (UNC)
 Marabella South/Vistabella—Gobin Persad Sinanan (COP)
 Pleasantville—Robert Parris (PNM)
 Cocoyea/Tarouba—Daren McLeod (UNC)
 Mon Repos/Navet—Shaka Joseph (PNM)
 Springvale/Paradise—John Mark Chankersingh (UNC)
 Les Efforts West/La Romaine—Anthony A Ramkissoon (UNC)
 Les Efforts East/Cipero—Navi Muradali (COP)

Borough of Arima: (Partnership)

 Calvary—Wayne John Bertrand (COP)
 Arima North East—Patricia T Cedeno-Metivier (COP)
 Arima West/O'Meara—Flora Singh (COP)
 Arima Central—Clinton Jennings (COP)
 Malabar North—Vedya Mahabir (COP)
 Malabar South—Anthony Garcia (PNM)
 Tumpuna—Hugo Ambrose Lewis (COP)

Borough of Point Fortin: (PNM)

 Techier/Guapo—Sherwin St Hillaire (PNM)
 Newlands/Mahaica—Janelle St Hilaire (PNM)
 Egypt—Abdon Mason (PNM)
 Cap-de-Ville/Fanny Village—Marilyn Ramnarinesingh (COP)
 Hollywood—Kennedy Kendel Richards (PNM)
 New Village—Kriscia Simon (PNM)

Borough of Chaguanas:(Partnership)

 Felicity/Endeavour—Orlando Nehru Nagessar (UNC)
 Edinburgh/Longdenville—Dwarka Singh (UNC)
 Montrose—Gopaul Boodhan (UNC)
 Cunupia—Renuka N Kangal (UNC)
 Enterprise North—Narsingh Rambarran (COP)
 Enterprise South—Ronald Heera (PNM)
 Charlieville—Falisha Isahak (UNC)
 Munroe Road/Caroni Savannah—Joey Samuel (UNC)

Regional Corporation of Couva/Tabaquite/Talparo:(Partnership)

 Chickland/Mamoral—Merle Mungroo (UNC)
 Freeport/Calcutta—Anil Baliram (UNC)
 St Mary's/Edinburgh—Sandra Ramsingh-Abdool (UNC)
 Felicity/Calcutta/McBean—Allan Seepersad (UNC)
 Perseverance/Waterloo—Annmarie Boodram (UNC)
 California/Pt Lisas—Christine Soobram (UNC)
 Balmain/Esperanza/Forres Park—Gangaram Gopaul (UNC)
 Claxton Bay/Pointe-a-Pierre—Camille Elie-Govind (UNC)
 Caratal/Tortuga—Suresh Pooran Maharaj (UNC)
 Gasparillo/Bonne Aventure—Feeraz Ali (UNC)
 Las Lomas/San Raphael—Dhanraj Saroop (UNC)
 Longdenville/Talparo—Rana Persad (UNC)
 Piparo/San Pedro/Tabaquite—Henry Awong (UNC)

Regional Corporation of Diego Martin: (Partnership)

 Chaguaramas/Point Cumana—Enroy Slater (PNM)
 Glencoe/Goodwood/La Puerta—Ricardo Garcia (COP)
 Covigne/Richplain—Katty Ann Christopher (PNM)
 Diamond Vale—Gail Donna La Touche (PNM)
 Bagatelle/Blue Basin—Lisa Maraj (UNC)
 St Lucien/Cameron Hill—Anne Letren (UNC)
 Moka/Boissiere No.2—Nadine Maria Romany (UNC)
 Morne Coco/Alyce Glen—Phillip Joseph Murray (UNC)
 Petit Valley/Cocorite—Wazim Daniel (UNC)
 Belle Vue/Boissiere No.1—Susan Rodriguez (UNC)

Regional Corporation of Mayaro/Rio Claro: (Partnership)

 Biche/Charuma—Glen Ram (UNC)
 Rio Claro South/Cat's Hill—Cyrilla Zola Cooper (UNC)
 Rio Claro North—Hazarie Ramdeen (UNC)
 Cocal/Mafeking—Keshrie Kissoon (UNC)
 Ecclesville—Shaffik Mohammed (UNC)
 Mayaro/Guayaguayare—Raymond Cozier (UNC)

Regional Corporation of Penal/Debe: (Partnership)

 Palmiste/Hermitage—Roland Hall (UNC)
 La Fortune—Amir J Junior B Saiphoo (UNC)
 Bronte—Brian N Julien (UNC)
 Debe East/L'Esperance/Union Hall—Marsha Jaimungal-Khan (UNC)
 Debe West—Skafte Awardy (UNC)
 Penal—Shanty Boodram (UNC)
 Barrackpore West—Premchand Sookoo (UNC)
 Rochard/Barrackpore East—Vishnu Ramlakhan (UNC)
 Quinam/Morne Diablo—Hyacinth Rampersadsingh (UNC)

Regional Corporation of Princes Town: (Partnership)

 Reform/Manahambre—Judy Barbara Hart (UNC)
 Ben Lomond/Hardbargain/Williamsville—Akash A Manickchand (UNC)
 Corinth/Cedar Hill—Winston D Chindra (UNC)
 Inverness/Princes Town—Deryck Mathura (UNC)
 New Grant/Tableland—Gowrie N Roopnarine (UNC)
 Hindustan/Indianwalk/St Mary's—Jules Vernon Downing (UNC)
 Lengua/St Julien—Alvin Lutchman (UNC)
 Fifth Company—Rafi Mohammed (UNC)
 Moruga—Phillip Gonzales (UNC)

Regional Corporation of San Juan/Laventille: (PNM)

 Maracas Bay/Santa Cruz/La Fillette—Lyndon Lara (PNM) 
 Febeau/Bourg Mulatresse—Roger Charles Celestine (COP)
 Morvant—Franz Lambkin (PNM)
 Caledonia/Upper Malick—Jeffrey Anthony Reyes (PNM)
 St Ann's/Cascade/Mon Repos West—Kenrick Preudhomme (COP)
 St Barb's/Chinapoo—Jason C Alexander (PNM)
 Beetham/Picton—Akil Audain (PNM)
 Success/Trou Macaque—Joel Harding (PNM)
 Aranguez/Warner Village—Santam Ramjit (UNC)
 Barataria—Harrylal Persad (UNC)
 Petit Bourg/Mount Lambert/Champs Fleurs—Kion Williams (PNM)
 San Juan East—Nazeemool Mohammed (UNC)
 San Juan West—Kwesi Junior Antoine (PNM)

Regional Corporation of Sangre Grande: (Partnership)

 Toco/Fishing Pond—Martin Rondon (PNM)
 Valencia—Lawrence P Lalla (UNC)
 Manzanilla—Annand Soodeen (UNC)
 Sangre Grande South—Patricia Debbie A Harris (UNC)
 Vega De Oropouche—Ravi Lakhan (UNC)
 Sangre Grande North West—Dayne Evan Francois (UNC)
 Cumuto/Tamana—Nirmal Singh (UNC)

Regional Corporation of Siparia: (Partnership)

 Avocat/San Francique North—Rajwantee Bullock (UNC)
 Siparia East/San Francique South—Leo Christiani Doodnath (UNC)
 Siparia West/Fyzabad—Doodnath Mayrhoo (UNC)
 Otaheite/Rousillac—Chanardaye Ramadharsingh (UNC)
 Brighton/Vessigny—Gerald Debesette (PNM)
 Mon Desir—Balkaran Frank Ramjit (UNC)
 Cedros—Fitzroy Paul Beache (UNC)
 Erin—Morena M. Martin Frederick (PNM)
 Palo Seco—Christine Neptune (PNM)

Regional Corporation of Tunapuna/Piarco (Partnership)

 Maracas/Santa Magarita—Winston C Ramsaroop (COP)
 Auzonville/Tunapuna—Esmond Irving Forde (PNM)
 Curepe/Pasea—Rosanna Sookdeo (COP)
 Caura/Paradise/Tacarigua—Sookdeo P Barath (COP)
 Macoya/Trincity—Ria Boodoo (COP)
 Five Rivers/Lopinot—Dianne Bishop (UNC)
 Bon Air/Arouca/Cane Farm—Colin Kerwin Rodney (PNM)
 Valsayn/St Joseph—Graham Butcher (UNC)
 Kelly Village/Warrenville—Khublal Paltoo (UNC)
 St Augustine South/Piarco/St Helena—Khadijah Ameen (UNC)
 Mausica/Maloney—Steven Sam (PNM)
 La Florissante/Cleaver— Erwin Augustine Hope (COP)
 D'Abadie/Carapo—J-Lynn Roopnarine (UNC)
 Blanchisseuse/Santa Rosa—Andrew V Mooteram (COP)
 Wallerfield/La Horquetta—Brian Hayden Joseph (PNM)

Nomination Day
Nomination day was July 5, 2010.

2010 elections in the Caribbean
2010 in Trinidad and Tobago
2010